The 1990–91 North West Counties Football League season was the ninth in the history of the North West Counties Football League, a football competition in England. Teams were divided into two divisions: Division One and Division Two.

Division One

Division One featured four new teams:
 Bacup Borough, promoted as runners-up of Division Two
 Eastwood Hanley, relegated from NPL Division One
 Maine Road, promoted as champions of Division Two
 Penrith, relegated from NPL Division One

League table

Division Two

Division Two featured six new teams:

 Bamber Bridge, joined from the Preston and District League
 Bradford Park Avenue, joined from the Central Midlands Football League
 Burscough, relegated from Division One
 Castleton Gabriels, joined from the Manchester Football League
 Chadderton, relegated from Division One
 Kidsgrove Athletic, joined from the Mid-Cheshire Football League

League table

References

External links 
 NWCFL Official Site

North West Counties Football League seasons
8